This list includes the biological mothers of Qajar Shahs, therefor queen mothers, titled in Persian Mahd-e Olia (Persian: "Sublime Cradle"). There were six shahs (kings) of the Qajar Empire in 7 generations. Throughout the 140-year history of the Qajar dynasty (r. 1785-1925) the shahs were all members of the same house, the house of Qajar.

See also
 Qajar dynasty family tree

References

Lists of Iranian women
Qajar harem
Qajar